The 2015–16 Kerala Premier League Season, Officially known as 3rd Dentcare Dental Lab Kerala Premier League due to sponsorship reasons, was the third season of the Kerala Premier League, a professional football league played in Kerala since 2013–14. Muvattupuzha Football Club Host the third Season. Muvattupuzha Municipal Stadium was the venue.The season featured 8 teams in men's edition and 4 teams in women's edition. The season kicked off on 16 April 2016. Marthoma College Women's Football Club emerged as the winners of the women's edition and remained unbeaten in the league. SBT beat Central Excise for 1–0 in the finals to clinch the Kerala Premier League title for the consecutive time.

Sponsorship
Ramco Cements was the sponsors of the first 2 seasons. For the 3rd Edition Dentcare Dental Lab Pvt. Ltd. came in as the sponsor of the League.

Men's

Structure
It featured the best eight teams of Kerala affiliated to the KFA competing for the Trophy. The league is played in a two single format where the teams were divided into 2 groups of 4 Teams each. Matches were hosted by Muvattupuzha Football Club and were played in Muvattupuzha Municipal Stadium. Top 2 teams from each group qualified for the semifinals. Three points are awarded for a win, one for a draw and zero for a loss. At the end of the season a table of the final League standings is determined, based on the following criteria in this order: points obtained, goal difference, and goals scored.

Teams
This is the completed club list for the 2015–16 season.

Group stage
Group A

Group B

Knockout stage

Matches

Semi-Finals

Final

Women's

Structure
It features four women's club teams from Kerala. All teams face each other once. Three points are awarded for a win, one for a draw and zero for a loss. At the end of the season a table of the final League standings is determined, based on the following criteria in this order: points obtained, goal difference, and goals scored.

Teams
This is the completed club list for the 2015–16 season.

League table

Matches

Kerala Premier League seasons
4